Edwin Henry Derrington (1 July 1830 – 14 October 1899) was a journalist and politician in colonial South Australia.

Derrington was born in Birmingham, Warwickshire, England, the first son and fourth child of Edwin Derrington, a Dissenting minister, and his wife Susannah, née Buggins. He was the member for Victoria in the South Australian House of Assembly from December 1871 to May 1873, and served as Commissioner of Crown Lands in the Henry Ayers Ministry from 22 January to 4 March 1872. He was forced to resign his seat after a series of financial problems. He unsuccessfully contested the seat of Gumeracha in 1887.

For many years, Derrington was connected with journalism in Victoria and South Australia; he was owner-editor of the Mount Gambier Standard from around 1869 to 1872. He then moved to Moonta, where he founded and ran the Yorke's Peninsula Advertiser and Miners' News for eleven years. He acquired the Port Adelaide News in 1878 and was its owner-editor until 1883. He purchased the Adelaide Punch from J. C. F. Johnson in 1881, but had no success with the venture; he disposed of it in 1884 and it folded shortly after. He resided at Kensington, South Australia.

References

Members of the South Australian House of Assembly
1830 births
1899 deaths
Australian newspaper editors
Australian newspaper proprietors
19th-century Australian journalists
19th-century Australian male writers
19th-century male writers
19th-century Australian politicians
19th-century Australian businesspeople
Australian male journalists